Springfield Terminal Railway may refer to:
Springfield Terminal Railway (Illinois) in northeastern Springfield, Illinois, incorporated 1908; crossed Sangamon Avenue just west of the Illinois Terminal Railroad crossing
Springfield Terminal Railway (Vermont), incorporated 1923, now part of the Pan Am Railways system; succeeded the Springfield Electric Railway